Notable Algerians include:

Artists

Writers (including poets)

Ferhat Abbas (1899–1985), political leader and essayist
Mohamed Aïchaoui (1921–1959), political leader and journalist
Abdelkader Alloula (born 1939), playwright
Al-Akhdari (1512–1575), Arab-Algerian poet, Alim, Astronomer, Jurist and Logician of sherifian descent.
Malek Alloula (born 1937), poet, writer, and critic
Djamal Amrani (1935–2005), poet and essayist
Jean Amrouche (1906–1962), 20th-century poet and writer
Taos Amrouche (1913–1976), singer and writer
Apuleius (c. 125–c. 180 C.E.), Latin prose writer
Mohammed Arkoun (born 1928), scholar and thinker
Leila Djabali (born 1933)
Zighen Aym (born 1957), writer and engineer
Farida Belghoul (born 1958), author
Omar Belhouchet (born 1954), journalist
Albert Camus (born 1913), journalist, author, philosopher
Mohammed Benchicou (born 1952), director and publisher of the Algerian newspaper Le Matin
Salah Benlabed (born 1950), architect, academic, novelist and poet
Latifa Ben Mansour (born 1950), writer, psychoanalyst, and linguist
Malek Bennabi (born 1905), writer and philosopher
Rachid Boudjedra (born 1941), poet, novelist, playwright and critic
Mohamed Cherak, journalist
Hélène Cixous, feminist writer
Mohammed Dib (1920–2003), 20th-century writer
Tahar Djaout (1954–1993), poet, journalist, critic
Assia Djebar (born 1936), novelist, translator and filmmaker
Mouloud Feraoun (1913–1962), writer and independence war hero
Mohamed Hassaïne (1945–1994), journalist
Miloud Hmida (born 1961), poet, critic, translator
Yasmina Khadra (also known as Mohamed Moulessehoul) (born 1955), writer
Aïssa Khelladi, journalist, novelist and playwright
Ahmed Mahsas (1923–2013), political leader and writer
Fodil Mezali (born 1959), journalist and writer
Hocine Mezali (born 1938), journalist and writer
Rachid Mimouni (1945–1995), writer, poet
Ahlam Mostaghanemi, writer
Othmane Senadjki (1959–2010), journalist
Kateb Yacine (1929–1989), 20th-century writer
Moufdi Zakaria (1908–1977), lyricist of the Algerian national anthem "Kassaman"

New media 

 Maurice Benayoun, artist and theorist
 Yves Saint Laurent (designer), clothing and fashion designer

Actors

 Hadj Abderrahmane, actor and comedian
 Allalou, playwright, theatre director, and actor known as the father of Algerian theater
 Mahieddine Bachtarzi, singer of opera (tenor), actor, writer, and director of the TNA (Théâtre National Algérien)
 Jean-Pierre Bacri, actor and screenwriter
 M'hamed Benguettaf, actor and playwright
 Jean Benguigui, stage, screen, and television actor
 Dali Benssalah, actor in James Bond movie No Time to Die (2021)
 Biyouna, singer, actress and comedian
 Mohamed Bouchaïb, Libya-born Algerian actor
 Sofia Boutella, actress, model and dancer
 Patrick Bruel, singer, actor, and professional poker player
 Alain Chabat, actor and director
 Mohamed Chouikh, filmmaker
 Mohamed Fellag, actor and comedian
 Khaled Habib, singer-songwriter, composer, actor, film director
 Roger Hanin, film actor and director
 Sid Ali Kouiret, actor
 Rachid Ksentini, actor and comedian
 Rouiched, comedy actor
 Lyes Salem, actor and film director
 Hadj Smaine Mohamed Seghir, actor, director, and man of stage
 Patrick Timsit, comedian, writer, and film director
 Larbi Zekkal, actor and comedian
 Marlène Jobert, actress, singer and author
 Eva Green, actress and model

Directors and filmmakers

 Merzak Allouache, film director
 Abdelkader Alloula, theatre producer
 Jean-Luc Azoulay, television producer
 Mohammed Lakhdar-Hamina, film director, Palme d'Or at the 1975 Cannes Festival
 Ahmed Rachedi, film director–producer, pioneer of Algerian cinema
 Fatma Zohra Zamoum, film director

Illustrators

 Ali Dilem, editorial cartoonist
 Baya, painter
 Feriel Boushaki, contemporary artist
 Hocine Ziani, painter
 Le Hic, editorial cartoonist
 Rezki Zerarti, painter

Leaders and politicians

Ancient Algeria

 Juba I, 1st-century BC, King of Numidia under Roman rule
 Juba II, 1st-century BC, King of Numidia under Roman rule
 Jugurtha, 2nd-century BC, King of Numidia
 Massinissa, 3rd-century BC, King of Numidia
 Tacfarinas, leader of a rebellion against the Romans
 Macrinus, Roman Emperor
 Pope Gelasius I, Pope from 1 March 492 to his death in 496
 Quintus Lollius Urbicus, Governor of Roman Britain

Early Islamic Algeria

 Abu Qurra, proclaimed Caliph by the banu ifran Berber tribe, founder of the indigenous Berber Muslim movement of Kharijite tendencies in North Africa and also founder of the Emirate of Tlemcen.
 Ibn Rustom, of Persian descent, founder of the Rustamid dynasty centered around Tiaret in modern-day Algeria.
 Buluggin ibn Ziri, 10th-century Emir; founder of the city of Algiers (Ed'Zayer in Algerian Arabic refers to his father Ziri ibn Menad, founder of the Zirid dynasty)
 Hammad ibn Buluggin, founder and first Sultan of the Hammadid dynasty centered around Al Qal'a of Beni Hammad  from 1008 to 1090 then Béjaïa from 1090 to 1152.
 Abd al-Mu'min, first Caliph and founder of the Almohad dynasty.
 Yaghmurasen Ibn Zyan, founder and first Sultan of the Zayyanid dynasty centered around Tlemcen in modern-day Algeria.

Ottoman Algeria 

 Hassan Agha, 16th-century Prince of Algiers; defeated Emperor Charles V in Algiers
 Baba Aruj, 16th-century corsair; leader of the Regency of Algiers
 Hayreddin Barbarossa, brother and successor of Aruj
 Rais Hamidou, Nicknamed 'Amir el Bihar' (leader of the seas) Admiral and last great leader of the Algerian Navy, of Berber descent.
 Zymen Danseker, A Dutch privateer during the Eighty Years' War, became admiral of the Algerian fleet from 1600 to 1610. He is said to have introduced the round ship to the Algerians.
 Sulayman Reis, A Dutch privateer during the Eighty Years' War; later turned to the corsair activity swearing allegiance to the Sultan of Algiers and became an officer under Zymen Danseker.

Algeria under French colonization 

 Emir Abdelkader, 19th-century leader of the resistance against French colonisation
 Mohamed ben Zamoum, 19th-century leader of the resistance against French colonisation
 Hadj Ahmed Bey, last Bey of Constantine; fought the French Army during two sieges in 1836 and 1837
 Cheikh Boumerdassi, 19th-century leader of the resistance against French colonisation
 Omar ben Zamoum, 19th-century leader of the resistance against French colonisation
 Messali Hadj, founder of the first North African and then Algerian Nationalist Parties
 Lalla Fatma N'Soumer, 19th-century female leader of the Kabyle resistance against the French
 Mohamed Seghir Boushaki, 20th-century leader of the Kabyle political resistance against the French
 Mohamed Deriche, 20th-century leader of the Kabyle political resistance against the French
 Messali Hadj, nationalist politician

Revolutionary War of Independence

 Ferhat Abbas, president of the provisional government of Algeria before independence, 1958–1961
 Mohamed Aïchaoui, journalist and independence war hero
 Colonel Amirouche, independence war hero
 Ali La Pointe, also known as Ali Ammar; independence war hero
 Krim Belkacem, independence war hero; vice president of the provisional government of Algeria
 Mostefa Benboulaid, Commander of Zone 1 during the independence war
 Hassiba Benbouali, female hero of the independence war
 Djamila Bouhired, female hero of the revolution
 Ahmed Mahsas, sociologist and independence war hero
 Larbi Ben M'hidi, Commander of Zone 5 during the independence war
 Abane Ramdane, political leader of the independence war; author of the "political over military" and "interior over exterior" principles
 Yacef Saadi, fighter in the independence war in the 1957 Battle of Algiers; actor in the 1966 war film by the same name after independence
 Mohamed Rahmoune, political and military leader of the independence war
 Abderrahmane Boushaki, political and military leader of the independence war
 Lyès Deriche, political leader of the independence war; member of the Revolutionary Committee of Unity and Action
 Yahia Boushaki, political and military leader of the independence war

Independent Algeria

 Hocine Ait Ahmed, political leader and head of the Socialist Forces Front opposition party (also a prominent independence war leader)
 Ahmed Ben Bella, Algeria's first President, 1962–1965
 Chadli Bendjedid, President of Algeria, 1979–1992
 Rabah Bitat, vice president of Algeria's first government, president of parliament
 Mohamed Boudiaf, President of Algeria, 1992 (also a prominent Independence war leader)
 Houari Boumedienne, President of Algeria, 1965–1978
 Abdelaziz Bouteflika, President of Algeria, 1999–2019
 Saïd Bouteflika, brother of Abdelaziz Bouteflika
 Lakhdar Brahimi, former Foreign Affairs Minister, Peace Envoy in Lebanon, Afghanistan and Iraq
 Émilie Busquant, French feminist, anarcho-syndicalist and anti-colonial activist; best known for the role in the creation of the Algerian flag
 Abdallah Djaballah, founder and leader of Al-Islah party
 Louisa Hanoune, founder and female leader of the PT (Workers Party)
 Chakib Khelil, former Minister of Energy and Mines, former OPEC president
 Abassi Madani, founder and leader of the Islamic Salvation Front (FIS) party
 Ahmed Mahsas, sociologist and founder and leader of the Union of Democratic Forces (UFD) party (also a prominent Independence war leader)
 Redha Malek, founder and leader of the ANR party
 Mahfoud Nahnah, founder and former leader of the HMS party
 Ahmed Ouyahia, former Prime Minister
 Nouara Saadia, Minister for Family and Women
 Said Sadi, founder and leader of the RCD party
 Liamine Zeroual, President of Algeria, 1994–1999

Martyrs

 Mohamed Aïchaoui
 Colonel Amirouche
 Hassiba Ben Bouali
 Larbi Ben M'hidi
 Cheikh Bouamama
 Houari Boumédiène 
 Mourad Didouche
 Malika Gaïd
 Zighoud Youcef
 Ahmed Zabana
 Moufdi Zakaria

Military and intelligence services

 José Aboulker, member of the anti-Nazi resistance; later a neurosurgeon and political figure in France
 Larbi Belkheir, (Aboulker) former general, Ambassador to Morocco
 Mohamed Lamari, former Chief of Staff of the People's National Army
 Smain Lamari, head of the Department of Counter-Espionage and Internal Security
 Mohamed Mediène ("Toufik"), head of the Department of Information and Security
 Khaled Nezzar, retired general

Musicians and singers

Berber
 Aïssa Djermouni, singer, poet
 Boualem Boukacem, singer, poet, musician
 Idir, singer, musician, composer
 Lounes Matoub, rebel singer of Kabyle music
 Lounis Ait Menguellet, singer, poet, musician
 Erika sawajiri, singer, Algerian mother and Japanese father
 Takfarinas, singer
 Marina Kaye, singer, French father and Algerian mother

Classical

 El Hachemi Guerouabi, musician and reformer of the Chaabi classical style
 Tarik o'reagan, musician, Irish father and Algerian mother 
 Dahmane El Harrachi, singer, composer and songwriter of Chaabi music
 El Hadj M'Hamed El Anka, the Grand Master of Andalusian classical music and Chaabi (Algeria) music.
 Warda Al-Jazairia, singer
 Boudjemaâ El Ankis, singer, musician, a performer of chaâbi music
 Kamel Messaoudi, performer of chaâbi music
 Abdelkader Chaou, chaabi music interpreter
 Cheikh El Hasnaoui, singer
 Mustapha Toumi, songwriter
 Hadj Bouchiba, songwriter, lyricist, composer, poet and painter
 Reda Doumaz, singer
 Mustapha Skandrani, pianist, performer of chaâbi music
 Khelifa Belkacem, singer
 Mohamed Boumerdassi, singer
 Hsissen, singer
 Farid Ali, singer
 Hadj M'rizek, songwriter, lyricist, composer, poet and painter
 Hadj Menouar, singer

Contemporary
 DJ Snake, DJ, producer, songwriter; French-Algerian artist, worked with several famous artists.

Jazz
 Franck Amsallem, jazz pianist, arranger, composer and singer
 Michel Benita, double bass player
Mohamed Rouane, Casbah-jazz, mondol player
 Martial Solal, jazz pianist and composer

Musiques du monde
 Mohamed Abdennour (Ptit Moh) composer, arranger, instrumentalist, variety of musical forms, Algerian mandole player
 Djamel Laroussi, singer, composer, songwriter, arranger and guitar player

Pop

 Baaziz, singer
 Enrico Macias (Gaston Ghrenassia), singer
 Souad Massi, singer
 Line Monty (Eliane Sarfati), singer
 Rajae El Mouhandiz, Dutch/Moroccan/Algerian singer, recording artist, storyteller and poet
 Zaho, singer

Rai

Messaoud Bellemou, raï musician, one of the most influential musicians of modern raï
 Safy Boutella, musician, composer
 Cheb Hasni, raï musician
 Cheb Mami, raï musician, also known as Mohamed Khelifati
 Faudel, raï musician
 Khaled, raï musician, also known as Khaled El Hadj Brahim
 Raïna Raï, band
 Cheikha Rimitti, rai musician
 Rachid Taha, raï–rock musician
 Cheb Tarik, raï musician

Rap
 Fianso, Franco-Algerian rapper. 
 Kenza Farah, Algerian singer-songwriter, Rap, R&B and Hip-Hop; sings in French language. 
 Lacrim, French-Algerian rapper, songwriter, has many hits in French game and American game.
 L'Algerino, singer and rapper. 
 Double Kanon, rapper, MC, producer, songwriter; songs engaging tracks against political system.
 PNL (Rap Duo), acronym of Peace N' Lovés, rap duo composed of two brothers: Ademo & N.O.S.
 Soolking, Algerian singer and rapper; he incorporates reggae, soul, hip hop and Algerian raï in his music.

Rock
 Rachid Taha, singer, musician

Religious figures

 Abdelkader El Djezairi, religious and military leader, Islamic scholar and Sufi
 Augustine of Hippo, Christian theologian
 Ahmad al-Alawi, Founder of the Sufi Alawiyya order
 Abdul Baqi Miftah, Sunni Muslim scholar and writer

Scholars and academics

Economists
Jacques Attali, economist, writer, and senior civil servant

Historians
 Mohamed Harbi, independence war historian
 Ibn Hammad (historian), medieval historian
 Ahmed Mohammed al-Maqqari, Algerian historian born in the 16th century

Linguistics
 Abderrahmane Hadj-Salah, 20th century linguist and president of the Algerian Academy of the Arabic Language
 Saïd Cid Kaoui, 19th century lexicographer and interpreter focusing on Berber
 Judah ibn Kuraish, 9th century Algerian grammarian and lexicographer focusing on Hebrew
 Ibn Muti al-Zawawi, 13th century Algerian grammarian focusing on Arabic
 Mouloud Mammeri, 20th century anthropologist, linguist, poet, writer
 Mohamed Bencheneb, 19th century linguist and historian

Science

 Claude Cohen-Tannoudji, physicist, Nobel prize (1997)
 Elias Zerhouni, radiologist and medical researcher
 Henri Atlan, biophysicist and philosopher
 Maamar Bettayeb, control theorist and systems scientist
 Mohamed Belhocine, internal medicine and epidemiology researcher
 Mustapha Ishak Boushaki, cosmologist and relativity researcher
 Noureddine Melikechi, atomic, molecular, and optical physicist researcher
 Rachid Deriche, computational imaging researcher

Philosophy

 Mohamed Arkoun, author, philosopher, historian
 Malek Bennabi, social and religious philosopher
 Jacques Derrida, deconstructionist philosopher
 Frantz Fanon, psychologist
 Bernard-Henri Lévy, philosopher and intellectual

Sports

Association football

 Adlene Guedioura, footballer & African champion 
 Sarah Bouhaddi, football goalkeeper
 William Ayache, footballer
 Christian Baudry (born 1955), footballer
 Lakhdar Belloumi, footballer; world cup participation in 1982, 1986
 Djamel Belmadi, coach, former footballer;
 Zahir Belounis, footballer
 Saïd Benrahma, footballer
 Abdelaziz Ben Tifour, footballer; one of the founders of the Algerian football team
 Karim Benzema, French national footballer; parents are Algerian
 Said Brahimi, footballer; one of the founders of the Algerian football team
 Ali Fergani, footballer and trainer
 Rabah Gamouh, international footballer;
 Abdelhamid Kermali, footballer; one of the founders of the Algerian football team
 Mahieddine Khalef, footballer and trainer
 Mustapha Khedali), footballer 
 Rabah Madjer, footballer; played in two World Cup games with Algeria, European champion with Porto, etc.
 Riyad Mahrez, footballer; played in one world cup ;
 Rachid Mekhloufi, footballer; one of the founders of the Algerian football team
 Said Belmokhtar, Kazakhstani-born Ukrainian footballer of Algerian descent
 Samir Nasri, French national footballer; parents are Algerian
 Yahia Ouahabi, retired player for JS Kabylie
 Islam Slimani, Algerian national footballer;  (World Cup 2014)  
 Mohamed Yahi, footballer for JS Kabylie and NA Hussein Dey
 Karim Ziani, Algerian national footballer; world cup participation in 2010
 Zinedine Zidane, French national footballer; parents are Algerian
 Kylian Mbappe, French national footballer, parents are Algerian and Cameroonese

Athletics

 Hassiba Boulmerka, athlete; 1500 m world and Olympic champion
 Taoufik Makhloufi, athlete; 1500 m Olympic champion
 Nouria Mérah-Benida, athlete; 1500 m Olympic champion
 Noureddine Morceli, athlete; 1500 m world and Olympic champion
 Artur Partyka, Polish high jumper; father is Algerian

Basketball
 Shahnez Boushaki, basketball player in Algeria women's national basketball team

Boxing

 Abdelhafid Benchabla, boxer
 Amine Boushaki, judoka
 Robert Cohen, world-champion bantamweight boxer
 Alphonse Halimi ("la Petite Terreur"), world-champion bantamweight boxer
 Myriam Lamare, boxer, French father and Algerian mother
 Mohamed Missouri, boxer

Fencing

 Tahar Hamou, foil fencer
 Anissa Khelfaoui, foil fencer
 Armand Mouyal (1925–1988), French world champion épée fencer
 Ferial Salhi, foil fencer

Ice hockey

 Josef Boumedienne, professional ice hockey player; Algerian and Finnish descent

Judo 

 Hassane Azzoun, Algerian judoka
 Sami Belgroun, Algerian judoka
 Abderahmane Benamadi, Algerian judoka
 Mounir Benamadi, Algerian judoka
 Amar Benikhlef, Algerian judoka
 Mohamed Bouaichaoui, Algerian judoka
 Faycal Bousbiat, Algerian judoka
 Amine Boushaki, Algerian judoka
 Lyès Bouyacoub, Algerian judoka
 Khaled Meddah, Algerian judoka
 Amar Meridja, Algerian judoka
 Omar Rebahi, Algerian judoka
 Mohamed-Amine Tayeb, Algerian judoka
 Nourredine Yagoubi, Algerian judoka
 Houd Zourdani, Algerian judoka

Other sports

 Ali Boulala, professional skateboarder; Algerian and Swedish descent
 Ines Ibbou, tennis player
 Kahina Bounab, volleyball player
 Alfred Nakache, Olympian world champion swimmer and water polo player

 Ramzi Boudjatit, professional windsurfer (fin and foil.kitsurf too)

Terrorists

 Djamel Beghal, French Algerian convicted of terrorism
 Abdul Nacer Benbrika, found guilty of being the leader of a terrorist organisation
 Mokhtar Belmokhtar, sentenced to death for murder and terrorism
 Slimane Khalfaoui, French-Algerian terrorist convicted of the Strasbourg cathedral bombing plot
 Ahmed Ressam, Algerian al-Qaeda member convicted of attempting to bomb the Los Angeles International Airport on New Year's Eve 1999
 Abu Musab Abdel Wadoud, leader of the Algerian Islamic militant group Al-Qaeda Organization in the Islamic Maghreb

See also

 List of people by nationality

References

Lists of Algerian people
Lists of Arabs